Taff Vale Railway Co v Amalgamated Society of Railway Servants [1901] UKHL 1, commonly known as the Taff Vale case, is a formative case in UK labour law. It held that, at common law, unions could be liable for loss of profits to employers that were caused by taking strike action.

The labour movement reacted to Taff Vale with outrage; the case gave impetus to the establishment of the UK Labour Party and was soon reversed by the Trade Disputes Act 1906. It was reversed at common law in Crofter Hand Woven Harris Tweed Co Ltd v Veitch [1942].

Facts
A trade union, called the Amalgamated Society of Railway Servants, went on strike to protest against the company's treatment of John Ewington, who had been refused higher pay and was punished for his repeated requests by being moved to a different station. When the Taff Vale Railway Company employed replacement staff, the strikers engaged in a sabotage campaign, greasing the rails and uncoupling the carriages. The Taff Vale Railway Company thus decided to engage with the union for the purpose of collective bargaining and the workers returned to work. The Railway Company, however, decided to sue the union for damages and won.

Previously it had been thought that trade unions could not be sued, because they were unincorporated entities, under the law of trusts.

Mr Justice Farwell held in favour of the company. His decision was reversed by the Court of Appeal, but restored on further appeal to the House of Lords.

Judgment
The House of Lords ruled that, if a union is capable of owning property, and capable of inflicting harm on others, then it is liable in tort for the damage it causes. Here, the damage was said to be the economic loss caused to the company when the employees broke their contracts of employment to go on strike. So the Taff Vale Railway Co was successful in suing for damages. It was awarded £23,000 plus court costs, reaching a total of £42,000. This set the precedent that unions could be held liable for damages resulting from actions by its officials. The Earl of Halsbury LC began.

Lord MacNaughten delivered the leading judgment.

Lord Shand's judgment was read as follows:

Lord Brampton concurred.

Lord Lindley, an expert on partnership law concurred.

Significance
Balfour's Conservative government later set up a Royal Commission, a decision that was unpopular among trade unionists. The decision was a turning point for the newly formed Labour Representation Committee. Affiliation from trade unions to the LRC stood at 350,000 in 1901 but rose to 450,000 in 1902 and 850,000 in 1903. Five more joined this cause in  through the formation of the 'League Chat'. A mass movement was being formed that led to the creation of the modern British Labour Party. Subsequently the Labour party was elected in a significant minority of the seats in Parliament and, in partnership with the Liberal government, passed the Trade Disputes Act 1906. This overrode the ruling in Taff Vale and provided the foundation for the law on the right to strike in the UK, that no cause of action could be brought against a trade union for economic loss, if a strike was "in contemplation or furtherance of a trade dispute". Although, English law does not provide a 'right' to strike in the strict sense, it is better seen as providing immunity from tortious liability should certain substantive and procedural requirements be met.

See also

Trade Disputes Act 1906
Quinn v Leatham [1901] AC 495 HL
South Wales Miners' Federation v Glamorgan Coal Co [1905] AC 239

Notes

References
G Lockwood, 'Taff Vale and the Trade Disputes Act 1906' in KD Ewing The Right to Strike, Institute of Employment Rights (2006) 11-30

United Kingdom labour case law
Political history of the United Kingdom
British trade unions history
Taff Vale Railway
Lord Lindley cases
House of Lords cases
1901 in case law
United Kingdom trade union case law
United Kingdom strike case law
1901 in British law
1901 in labor relations
Railway litigation in 1901